A Mars-crossing asteroid (MCA, also Mars-crosser, MC) is an asteroid whose orbit crosses that of Mars. Some Mars-crossers numbered below 100000 are listed here.

Many databases, for instance the JPL Small-Body Database (JPL SBDB), only list asteroids with a perihelion greater than 1.3 AU as Mars-crossers. An asteroid with a perihelion less than this is classed as a near-Earth object even though it is crossing the orbit of Mars as well as crossing (or coming near to) that of Earth. Nevertheless, these objects are listed on this page. A grazer is an object with a perihelion below the aphelion of Mars (1.67 AU) but above the Martian perihelion (1.38 AU). The JPL SBDB lists 13,500 Mars-crossing asteroids. Only 18 MCAs are brighter than absolute magnitude (H) 12.5, which typically makes these asteroids with H<12.5 more than 13 km in diameter depending on the albedo. The smallest known MCAs have an absolute magnitude (H) of around 24 and are typically less than 100 meters in diameter. There are over 21,600 known Mars-crossers of which only 5751 have received a MPC number.

Earth having more gravity and surface area than Mars attracts more impactors than Mars. Earth is impacted about 20 times more than the Moon, and Mars only gets impacted about 3 to 5 times more than the Moon.

Co-orbital
 (leading cloud):
 

 (trailing cloud):
 5261 Eurekathe only named Mars trojan
 
 
 
 
 

Candidates

Inner grazers

 1951 Lick
 4947 Ninkasi
 (10302) 1989 ML
 15817 Lucianotesi
 
 
 (52381) 1993 HA
 52387 Huitzilopochtli
 
 
 
 
 
 (85236) 1993 KH

Inner grazers that are also Earth-crossers or grazers

 1620 Geographos
 1865 Cerberus
 2063 Bacchus
 3361 Orpheus
 3362 Khufu
 3753 Cruithne
 4034 Vishnu
 4581 Asclepius
 4769 Castalia
 6239 Minos
 (10115) 1992 SK
 11500 Tomaiyowit
 12711 Tukmit
 (17511) 1992 QN

Mars-crossers that are also Earth-crossers or grazers
These objects are not catalogued as Mars-crossers in databases such as the Jet Propulsion Laboratory's online Small-body Database Browser.  Instead, they are categorized as Near Earth Objects (NEOs).

 1566 Icarus
 1685 Toro
 1862 Apollo
 1863 Antinous
 1864 Daedalus
 1866 Sisyphus
 1981 Midas
 2101 Adonis
 2102 Tantalus
 2135 Aristaeus
 2201 Oljato
 2212 Hephaistos
 2329 Orthos
 3103 Eger
 3200 Phaethon
 3360 Syrinx
 3671 Dionysus
 3752 Camillo
 3838 Epona
 4015 Wilson-Harrington
 4179 Toutatis
 4183 Cuno
 4197 Morpheus
 4257 Ubasti
 4341 Poseidon
 4450 Pan
 4486 Mithra
 4660 Nereus
 (4953) 1990 MU
 5011 Ptah
 (5131) 1990 BG
 5143 Heracles
 (5189) 1990 UQ
 (5496) 1973 NA
 (5645) 1990 SP
 (5660) 1974 MA
 (5693) 1993 EA
 5731 Zeus
 5786 Talos
 (5828) 1991 AM
 (6037) 1988 EG
 
 
 6063 Jason
 (6455) 1992 HE
 6489 Golevka
 (6611) 1993 VW
 (7025) 1993 QA
 7092 Cadmus
 (7335) 1989 JA
 (7341) 1991 VK
 (7350) 1993 VA
 
 (7753) 1988 XB
 (7888) 1993 UC
 (7889) 1994 LX
 (8014) 1990 MF
 (8035) 1992 TB
 (8176) 1991 WA
 
 
 (8566) 1996 EN
 (9058) 1992 JB
 9162 Kwiila
 (9202) 1993 PB
 (9856) 1991 EE
 
 
 
 11066 Sigurd
 11311 Peleus
 
 11885 Summanus
 (12538) 1998 OH
 12923 Zephyr
 (13651) 1997 BR
 14827 Hypnos
 
 
 
 
 (17182) 1999 VU
 
 
 
 
 
 (22753) 1998 WT
 
 
 (24443) 2000 OG
 
 24761 Ahau
 25143 Itokawa
 
 
 
 
 (29075) 1950 DA
 
 
 
 
 
 
 (36236) 1999 VV
 
 (37638) 1993 VB
 37655 Illapa
 38086 Beowulf
 
 
 
 
 (52340) 1992 SY
 
 
 
 
 
 
 
 
 
 
 (65690) 1991 DG
 
 (65733) 1993 PC
 65803 Didymos
 
 
 
 
 
 
 
 
 
 
 
 
 69230 Hermes

Outer grazers

 132 Aethra
 323 Brucia
 391 Ingeborg
 475 Ocllo
 512 Taurinensis
 699 Hela
 1009 Sirene
 1011 Laodamia
 1065 Amundsenia
 1131 Porzia
 1134 Kepler
 1139 Atami
 1170 Siva
 1198 Atlantis
 1204 Renzia
 1235 Schorria
 1293 Sonja
 1310 Villigera
 1316 Kasan
 1374 Isora
 1468 Zomba
 1474 Beira
 1508 Kemi
 1565 Lemaître
 1593 Fagnes
 1640 Nemo
 1656 Suomi
 1727 Mette
 1747 Wright
 1750 Eckert
 2035 Stearns
 2044 Wirt
 2055 Dvořák
 2064 Thomsen
 2074 Shoemaker
 2077 Kiangsu
 2078 Nanking
 2099 Öpik
 2204 Lyyli
 2253 Espinette
 2423 Ibarruri
 2449 Kenos
 2577 Litva
 2744 Birgitta
 2937 Gibbs
 2968 Iliya
 3040 Kozai
 3163 Randi
 3198 Wallonia
 3216 Harrington
 3255 Tholen
 3267 Glo
 3270 Dudley
 3287 Olmstead
 3343 Nedzel
 3392 Setouchi
 3397 Leyla
 3401 Vanphilos
 3402 Wisdom
 3416 Dorrit
 3443 Leetsungdao
 3496 Arieso
 3581 Alvarez
 3635 Kreutz
 3674 Erbisbühl
 3737 Beckman
 3800 Karayusuf
 3854 George
 3858 Dorchester
 3873 Roddy
 3920 Aubignan
 4142 Dersu-Uzala
 4205 David Hughes
 4276 Clifford
 4435 Holt
 4451 Grieve
 4558 Janesick
 4910 Kawasato
 4995 Griffin
 5038 Overbeek
 5066 Garradd
 5201 Ferraz-Mello
 5230 Asahina
 5246 Migliorini
 5251 Bradwood
 5253 Fredclifford
 5275 Zdislava
 5335 Damocles
 5349 Paulharris
 5392 Parker
 
 5585 Parks
 5621 Erb
 5641 McCleese
 5642 Bobbywilliams
 5649 Donnashirley
 5682 Beresford
 5720 Halweaver
 5738 Billpickering
 5817 Robertfrazer
 5870 Baltimore
 5892 Milesdavis
 5929 Manzano
 5999 Plescia
 6041 Juterkilian
 6042 Cheshirecat
 6141 Durda
 6170 Levasseur
 6172 Prokofeana
 6183 Viscome
 6249 Jennifer
 6261 Chione
 (6263) 1980 PX
 6386 Keithnoll
 6411 Tamaga
 6446 Lomberg
 6444 Ryuzin
 
 6485 Wendeesther
 6487 Tonyspear
 
 6500 Kodaira
 6523 Clube
 6585 O'Keefe
 6847 Kunz-Hallstein
 
 6909 Levison
 7002 Bronshten
 7079 Baghdad
 7267 Victormeen
 7304 Namiki
 7330 Annelemaître
 7345 Happer
 7369 Gavrilin
 7445 Trajanus
 
 7505 Furusho
 
 7723 Lugger
 7778 Markrobinson
 7816 Hanoi
 7818 Muirhead
 
 8251 Isogai
 8256 Shenzhou
 8355 Masuo
 8373 Stephengould
 8444 Popovich
 8651 Alineraynal
 8722 Schirra
 (9068) 1993 OD
 9082 Leonardmartin
 
 9551 Kazi
 9564 Jeffwynn
 
 9671 Hemera
 9767 Midsomer Norton
 
 (9881) 1994 SE
 
 10051 Albee
 10502 Armaghobs
 
 (10578) 1995 LH
 10737 Brück
 10984 Gispen
 11152 Oomine
 
 
 11836 Eileen
 (12009) 1996 UE
 
 
 
 
 
 13551 Gadsden
 
 13920 Montecorvino
 (14017) 1994 NS
 
 
 14223 Dolby
 14309 Defoy
 
 
 
 
 15609 Kosmaczewski
 15673 Chetaev
 (15700) 1987 QD
 (15778) 1993 NH
 15790 Keizan
 16142 Leung
 
 16465 Basilrowe
 
 16529 Dangoldin
 16588 Johngee
 
 (16635) 1993 QO
 16724 Ullilotzmann
 
 
 16958 Klaasen
 17435 di Giovanni
 17493 Wildcat
 
 17640 Mount Stromlo
 17744 Jodiefoster
 
 
 18284 Tsereteli
 18398 Bregenz
 18499 Showalter
 
 
 18751 Yualexandrov
 
 
 
 19080 Martínfierro
 19127 Olegefremov
 
 
 (19877) 9086 P-L
 
 20037 Duke
 
 
 20187 Janapittichova
 
 
 
 
 (20958) A900 MA
 21001 Trogrlic
 (21028) 1989 TO
 
 
 21104 Sveshnikov
 
 (21228) 1995 SC
 
 
 21966 Hamadori
 22168 Weissflog
 22283 Pytheas
 22385 Fujimoriboshi
 22449 Ottijeff
 
 
 
 
 
 
 
 
 
 
 
 24643 MacCready
 24654 Fossett
 (24682) 1990 BH
 
 
 
 
 
 
 
 
 
 
 (26050) 3167 T-2
 26074 Carlwirtz
 
 (26129) 1993 DK
 
 
 
 26471 Tracybecker
 
 26858 Misterrogers
 26879 Haines
 
 
 
 27657 Berkhey
 
 
 
 
 
 
 (29407) 1996 UW
 
 
 
 
 
 (30717) 1937 UD
 
 30767 Chriskraft
 
 30775 Lattu
 30785 Greeley
 30786 Karkoschka
 (30800) 1989 ST
 (30856) 1991 XE
 30963 Mount Banzan
 
 31098 Frankhill
 
 
 
 
 
 
 
 
 
 
 
 
 
 
 
 
 
 32890 Schwob
 32897 Curtharris
 
 (33060) 1997 VY
 
 33330 Barèges
 
 
 
 
 
 
 
 34817 Shiominemoto
 35056 Cullers
 
 
 
 
 
 
 
 (37314) 2001 QP
 
 (37367) 2001 VC
 
 (37479) 1130 T-1
 (37568) 1989 TP
 37596 Cotahuasi
 
 
 (38063) 1999 FH
 
 
 
 
 
 
 
 (39561) 1992 QA
 
 39741 Komm
 
 (40271) 1999 JT
 (40315) 1999 LS
 
 
 
 
 
 
 
 
 
 
 
 
 
 (42501) 1992 YC
 42531 McKenna
 42609 Daubechies
 
 
 
 
 
 
 
 
 
 
 
 (45251) 1999 YN
 (45764) 2000 LV
 
 
 
 
 
 
 (47035) 1998 WS
 
 
 
 
 
 
 
 
 
 (48450) 1991 NA
 
 
 (48621) 1995 OC
 
 
 (49664) 1999 MV
 
 
 
 
 
 
 
 (51773) 2001 MV
 
 (52310) 1991 VJ
 
 52384 Elenapanko
 (52439) 1994 QL
 (52453) 1994 WC
 (52722) 1998 GK
 
 
 
 
 
 
 
 
 
 
 
 
 (55757) 1991 XN
 
 
 
 
 
 
 
 
 
 
 (58050) 2002 YA
 (58070) 1034 T-2
 
 
 
 
 
 
 
 
 
 
 
 
 
 
 
 
 
 
 
 
 
 
 
 
 
 
 
 
 
 
 
 
 
 
 
 
 (65757) 1994 FV
 
 65784 Naderayama
 
 
 (65999) 1998 ND
 
 
 
 
 
 66458 Romaplanetario
 
 
 
 
 
 
 
 
 
 
 
 
 
 (69239) 1978 XT
 69260 Tonyjudt
 
 (69307) 1992 ON
 69311 Russ
 (69350) 1993 YP
 
 
 
 
 
 
 
 
 
 
 (73575) 4789 P-L
 
 
 
 
 (73865) 1997 AW
 
 
 
 
 
 
 
 
 
 
 
 
 
 
 
 
 
 
 
 
 
 
 
 
 
 77971 Donnolo
 
 
 
 
 (79219) 1994 LN
 
 
 
 
 
 
 
 
 
 
 
 
 
 
 
 
 
 
 
 
 
 
 
 
 
 (85118) 1971 UU
 85119 Hannieschaft
 85158 Phyllistrapp
 
 85185 Lederman
 (85235) 1993 JA
 (85274) 1994 GH
 
 (85383) 1996 MS
 
 
 
 
 
 
 (86373) 1999 YK
 
 
 
 
 
 
 
 
 
 
 
 
 
 
 
 
 
 (89454) 2001 XG
 
 
 
 
 
 
 (90916) 1997 LR
 
 
 
 
 
 
 
 
 (93040) 2000 SG
 
 
 
 
 
 
 
 
 (95711) 2003 AK
 
 
 
 (96080) 7649 P-L

Mars-crossers

 433 Eros
 719 Albert
 887 Alinda
 1036 Ganymed
 1221 Amor
 1580 Betulia
 1627 Ivar
 1915 Quetzálcoatl
 1916 Boreas
 1917 Cuyo
 1943 Anteros
 1980 Tezcatlipoca
 2059 Baboquivari
 2061 Anza
 2202 Pele
 2335 James
 2368 Beltrovata
 2608 Seneca
 2629 Rudra
 3102 Krok
 3122 Florence
 3199 Nefertiti
 3271 Ul
 3288 Seleucus
 3352 McAuliffe
 3551 Verenia
 3552 Don Quixote
 3553 Mera
 3691 Bede
 (3757) Anagolay
 3833 Calingasta
 3908 Nyx
 (3988) Huma
 4055 Magellan
 4401 Aditi
 4487 Pocahontas
 4503 Cleobulus
 4587 Rees
 (4596) 1981 QB
 (4688) 1980 WF
 4775 Hansen
 4954 Eric
 4957 Brucemurray
 5324 Lyapunov
 5332 Davidaguilar
 5370 Taranis
 (5407) 1992 AX
 (5587) 1990 SB
 5620 Jasonwheeler
 (5626) 1991 FE
 (5646) 1990 TR
 5653 Camarillo
 (5732) 1988 WC
 5751 Zao
 5797 Bivoj
 (5836) 1993 MF
 5863 Tara
 (5867) 1988 RE
 5869 Tanith
 5879 Almeria
 6050 Miwablock
 6130 Hutton
 (6178) 1986 DA
 6318 Cronkite
 (6322) 1991 CQ
 6456 Golombek
 (6491) 1991 OA
 6564 Asher
 6569 Ondaatje
 7088 Ishtar
 7096 Napier
 (7236) 1987 PA
 7336 Saunders
 7358 Oze
 (7474) 1992 TC
 7480 Norwan
 7604 Kridsadaporn
 (7839) 1994 ND
 
 8013 Gordonmoore
 8034 Akka
 
 
 8709 Kadlu
 9172 Abhramu
 
 9950 ESA
 9969 Braille
 (10150) 1994 PN
 10295 Hippolyta
 10416 Kottler
 (10860) 1995 LE
 (11054) 1991 FA
 11284 Belenus
 
 12008 Kandrup
 13553 Masaakikoyama
 (14402) 1991 DB
 15745 Yuliya
 16064 Davidharvey
 (16636) 1993 QP
 (16657) 1993 UB
 16695 Terryhandley
 16912 Rhiannon
 
 18106 Blume
 
 
 
 (18736) 1998 NU
 
 
 
 (20086) 1994 LW
 
 20460 Robwhiteley
 
 21088 Chelyabinsk
 
 
 
 
 (23621) 1996 PA
 
 
 
 
 
 
 
 
 (26817) 1987 QB
 
 
 
 (30854) 1991 VB
 
 
 (31345) 1998 PG
 
 (32906) 1994 RH
 
 
 
 
 
 (37336) 2001 RM
 
 
 
 
 39557 Gielgud
 (39565) 1992 SL
 
 (39796) 1997 TD
 
 
 (40329) 1999 ML
 
 
 
 
 
 
 
 
 (54401) 2000 LM
 
 
 (54690) 2001 EB
 
 (65674) 1988 SM
 (65706) 1992 NA
 
 
 
 
 
 
 
 (85182) 1991 AQ
 (85275) 1994 LY
 
 85585 Mjolnir
 
 
 
 
 
 
 
 
 
 
 
 
 
 
 
 
 
 
 
 
 
 
 
 
 
 
 
 (89830) 2002 CE

See also
 List of Mercury-crossing minor planets
 List of Venus-crossing minor planets
 List of Earth-crossing minor planets
 List of Jupiter-crossing minor planets
 List of Saturn-crossing minor planets
 List of Uranus-crossing minor planets
 List of Neptune-crossing minor planets
 Near-Mars object

References

External links
 Jet Propulsion Laboratory Small-Body Database Browser
 Very Close Approaches (<0.01 AU) of PHAs to Mars 1900–2200
 Upcoming Close Approaches (<0.10 AU) of Near-Earth Objects to Mars
 Planetary Close Encounters for the next 200 years

Mars-crossing